Vidmer Mercatali (born 17 May 1949) is an Italian politician who served as a Senator (2006–2013) and Mayor of Ravenna for two terms (1997–2006).

References

1949 births
Mayors of Ravenna
Senators of Legislature XV of Italy
Senators of Legislature XVI of Italy
Living people
People from Forlì